Quercinol (a chromene derivative), isolated from the mushroom Daedalea quercina, has in vitro anti-inflammatory activity, and inhibits the enzymes cyclooxygenase 2, xanthine oxidase, and horseradish peroxidase.

References

Benzopyrans
Methoxy compounds